Tafjord is a village in Fjord Municipality in Møre og Romsdal county, Norway.

The village is very isolated and (other than by boat) the only way into the valley is by road from the village of Sylte.

Climate
The January record  was earlier a national record until it was beaten in 2020. These warm temperatures in winter and late autumn are primarily due to foehn wind.

Tafjord avalanch disaster
The rock landed in the Tafjorden which created a local tsunami which killed 34 people living on the shore of the fjord. It was one of the worst natural disasters in Norway in the 20th century.

References

Villages in Møre og Romsdal
Fjord (municipality)